The Caotun Night Market or Caoxiedun Tourism Night Market is a night market in Caotun Township, Nantou County, Taiwan.

Features
The night market sells various delicacies in their food stalls. Game stalls are also available at the market.

See also
 List of night markets in Taiwan

References

Buildings and structures in Nantou County
Caotun Township
Night markets in Taiwan
Tourist attractions in Nantou County